Ed Garcia (born February 3, 1943) is a Filipino human rights activist, peace advocate, and writer.

Ed Garcia may also refer to:

Eddie Garcia (1929–2019), Filipino actor, television personality, film director and producer
Eddie Garcia (American football) (born 1959), American football player
Edgar García (disambiguation)
Edu García (born 1990), Spanish footballer
Eduardo García (disambiguation)
Edward J. Garcia (born 1928), American judge